Rope Rescue is a 2D physics-based rope puzzle game developed by American studio Untame Games and published by Chillingo Games for iOS.

Reception

The game has received generally favorable reviews with a Metacritic score of 69/100 based on 5 reviews.

The TouchArcade review praised the complexity of the scrap metal, but noted the monotony of the elements. Also criticized were the screams of a parrot when it is pierced by a knife: «...but  the way the knives are depicted sticking blade-first out of a rock, combined with the bird shrieking upon being stabbed, felt a little wrong for a casual puzzle game about saving little baby birds».

References

External links
 Game Website
 Publisher Website

2011 video games
Android (operating system) games
Puzzle video games
IOS games
Video games developed in the United States
Chillingo games